James Dumper was a professional footballer. An outside right, he played in the Football League for Blackpool.

References

Year of birth missing
Year of death missing
Blackpool F.C. players
Association football outside forwards
English footballers